The Huon Valley, or simply the Huon, is a valley and geographic area located in southern Tasmania, Australia. The largest town is Huonville, with other smaller towns spread across the area. It includes Australia's most southern permanent settlement at Southport. The Huon Valley Council area had a population of 15,140 in 2011. Famed for its apple growing, the Valley was first settled by British colonists in the 1820s; prior to settlement the Huon Valley area was inhabited by the Mouheneenner,  Nuenonne,  Mellukerdee  and  Lyluequonny people.
 
The area it is sometimes combined as the Huon-Channel area with the areas around D'Entrecasteaux Channel.

Etymology
The Huon Valley, along with its local government authority, several towns, the Huon River and the Huon Pine, were named after Jean-Michel Huon de Kermadec.

Economy
The Huon is both a major agricultural area, particularly famous for growing apples (83% of Tasmanian apples originate in the Valley), but also producing cherries, berries and stone fruit, and is home to many commuter workers who work in Hobart or Kingston and prefer to live in a more rural setting. It is also a major source of seafood; the Valley hosts the headquarters of Huon Aquaculture and the major processing plants for Tassal. The Valley had a gross regional product of $0.71 billion in 2020; the largest employers are agriculture, forestry and aquaculture, followed by healthcare and retail. Tourism is a growing industry in the Huon Valley, and the valley attracts around 25% of Tasmania's tourist visitors.

History
The area was first settled by Europeans in the early 1820s. In 1843 Thomas Judd planted the first apple trees, founding the industry that made the Huon famous. He was followed by Silas Parsons, founder of Grove and then Wm. Barnett, Wm. Cuthbert and then William Geeves, namesake of Geeveston.

Government
The valley falls entirely into the Commonwealth Division of Franklin and the Tasmanian House of Assembly State Division of Franklin. The Huon Valley Council is the local government authority. It was previously divided among the Municipalities of Port Cygnet, Espererance and Huon, which merged in 1993 to form the Huon Valley Council.

Localities in the local government area of the Huon Valley include:

Media
The Huon Valley hosts the Huon News, a weekly local newspaper, and the Cygnet & Channel Classifieds, a small local newsletter. Pulse FM Kingborough and Huon is the local youth radio station, and Geeveston is the headquarters of Huon & Kingston FM, a community radio station. It was historically served by the Huon Times, which closed in 1942.

See also

References

 
Valleys of Tasmania